Calamotropha fuscilineatellus is a species of moth in the family Crambidae. It was described by Daniel Lucas in 1938 and is found in Portugal, on Sardinia and in Morocco.

References

Moths described in 1938
Crambinae
Moths of Europe